Journey to the Unknown is a British anthology television series, produced by Hammer Film Productions and 20th Century Fox Television. It aired on ABC from September 26, 1968, to January 30, 1969. The series aired in the UK on the ITV network during 1969.

Format
The series has a fantasy, science fiction, supernatural and horror theme, very similar to the American television series The Twilight Zone, and deals with normal people whose everyday situations somehow become extraordinary. It featured both British and American actors: American actors included George Maharis, Vera Miles, Barbara Bel Geddes, Patty Duke, Carol Lynley, Joseph Cotten, Stefanie Powers and Brandon deWilde, along with familiar British actors such as Dennis Waterman, Jane Asher, Kay Walsh, Roddy McDowall, Nanette Newman, Ann Bell and Tom Adams. Seventeen episodes were produced. Directors of the episodes included Roy Ward Baker, Alan Gibson, Robert Stevens, Don Chaffey and Michael Lindsay-Hogg. Each episode was executive-produced either by Joan Harrison or Norman Lloyd, both of whom had co-produced Alfred Hitchcock Presents and The Alfred Hitchcock Hour from 1955 to 1965.

In America, eight episodes from the series were broadcast as four made-for-television films consisting of twinned episodes along with new segment introduction footage provided by actors Patrick McGoohan, Sebastian Cabot and Joan Crawford serving as hosts:

Opening title sequence
The series had a memorable whistled theme tune composed by Harry Robinson of Hammer Film Productions, and a creepy title sequence that featured a roller coaster filmed at night at a deserted amusement park (Battersea Park Fun Fair in the London Borough of Wandsworth, London).

Episodes

References

External links
 
 
 Publicity material on series from Hammer Journey to the Unknown (Hammer/TCF 1968-69)

1968 American television series debuts
1969 American television series endings
British science fiction television shows
British supernatural television shows
British horror fiction television series
American Broadcasting Company original programming
1960s British anthology television series
Hammer Film Productions
Television series by 20th Century Fox Television
English-language television shows
Science fiction anthology television series
Television shows shot at MGM-British Studios